Rafał Murawski (born 9 October 1981), is a former Polish football midfielder.

Club career
Murawski was born in Malbork. While spending his youth club time mostly in Gdańsk, he signed his first senior contract with Arka Gdynia, where he spent four successful years.

In 2005, he moved to Amica Wronki, only one year later to Lech Poznań.

In Summer 2009, he moved to Russian club Rubin Kazan on a three-year contract. However, in August 2011, he returned to Lech Poznań and signed for three and a half years.

International career
He made his debut on 15 November 2006 in the Euro 2008 qualifier match, against Belgium in Brussels. Almost exactly one year later on 21 November 2007, he also scored his first goal for Poland during the Euro 2008 qualifier match against and in Serbia. He played for Poland in all three games during Euro 2012.

Career statistics

Club

12 appearances in Ekstraklasa Cup.
12 appearances in I liga play-off.
11 appearance in Ekstraklasa Cup.

International goals
Scores and results list Poland's goal tally first.

References

External links

 
 National team stats on the website of the Polish Football Association 

1981 births
Living people
Association football midfielders
Polish footballers
Poland international footballers
Arka Gdynia players
Amica Wronki players
Lech Poznań players
FC Rubin Kazan players
Pogoń Szczecin players
UEFA Euro 2008 players
UEFA Euro 2012 players
People from Malbork
Ekstraklasa players
Russian Premier League players
Polish expatriate footballers
Expatriate footballers in Russia
Sportspeople from Pomeranian Voivodeship
Gedania 1922 Gdańsk players